There are three organisations operating 2nd XV Leagues in Scotland. These are (by membership size):
 Scottish Reserve League (involving some 3rd XVs)
 the Edinburgh & Lothian 2nd XV League (also involving some 3rd XVs)
 the Borders Championship
In addition, a small competition is organised exclusively for 3rd (and some 4th) XVs:
 the East of Scotland 3rd XV League

2nd XV rugby union (that is, matches for teams involving players not picked for their club's first team) is popular in Scotland, due to the amateur and social nature of the game. Most clubs run 2nd XV teams of one sort of another, although not all of these participate in leagues. The largest clubs (usually based in the cities) often have the player pool and finance to run 2nd, 3rd and even 4th XVs (and in very occasional circumstances even 5th and 6th XVs have been known). Smaller clubs may only occasionally be able to form 2nd XVs, and the smallest clubs will not have any kind of team apart from their first team. Many smaller clubs only play 2nd XV friendlies, when they can raise a team.

Often, if a friendly is to be played, it is convenient to arrange it with the same opponents as the first team that weekend. Thus if team A are at home to team B on a main pitch, A's 2nd XV may well be playing a friendly v B's 2nd XV on a back pitch nearby. Or B's second XV may host A's second XV, if back pitches are not available. However, organised 2nd XV leagues operate on a pre-decided schedule.

Some clubs that have amalgamated keep a 2nd XV team utilising the name of one of the former clubs.

Note that a small number of clubs run 2nd XVs in the following leagues which include first team clubs as well:
 Grampian Alliance League
 Highland Alliance League

University rugby in Scotland, including that for 2nd, 3rd and 4th XVs, is organised separately (although Edinburgh University run 2nd and 3rd XVs in The Scottish 2nd XV League. For information on this aspect of the domestic game, and details on Women's 2nd XVs, see University Leagues in Scotland.

Reserve